The 1937 Brown Bears football team represented Brown University as an independent during the 1937 college football season. Led by 12th-year head coach Tuss McLaughry, the Bears compiled a record of 5–4.

Schedule

References

Brown
Brown Bears football seasons
Brown Bears football